The men's allround combination of the 2015–16 ISU Speed Skating World Cup 5, arranged in the Sørmarka Arena in Stavanger, Norway, was contested on 29–31 January 2016. It was the only allround combination competition of the 2015–16 World Cup.

The contest included each skater's time from the 1500 metres and 5000 metres competitions that were raced during the weekend. Bart Swings of Belgium had the best combined result, while Norwegian skaters Sverre Lunde Pedersen and Håvard Bøkko came in second and third place.

Results

References

Men allround combination
5